The 2021 Mountain West Conference football season, part of this year's NCAA Division I FBS football season was the 23rd season of college football for the Mountain West Conference (MW). Since 2012, 12 teams have competed in the Mountain West Conference. The season began on August 28, 2021 and ended on December 28, 2021. The entire schedule was released on March 5, 2021.

Previous season

The San Jose State Spartans defeated the Boise State Broncos 34–20 in the 2020 Mountain West Conference Football Championship Game at Sam Boyd Stadium in Whitney, Nevada.

Preseason

Mountain West Media
The Mountain West Media days was held at the Cosmopolitan on July 27 and 28.

Preseason Poll
The Preseason Media Poll was released July 21, 2021. Boise State was picked to win the Mountain division, while Nevada was picked to win the West division.

Preseason awards
The following list contains players included on preseason watch lists for national awards.

Preseason All-Conference Team
The Preseason All-Conference Team was announced only July 22, 2021.

Offensive player of the year: Carson Strong (Junior, Nevada quarterback)
Defensive player of the year: Cade Hall (Senior, San Jose State defensive lineman)
Special Teams Player of the Year: Savon Scarver (Senior, Utah State kick returner)

Rankings

Coaches

Coaching Changes
Bryan Harsin left Boise State after seven years at the school to take the head coach position at Auburn of the SEC. He was replaced by Andy Avalos.

Gary Andersen was fired by Utah State in November 2020. He was replaced by Blake Anderson.

Head Coaches

Post-season changes
On November 29, Fresno State head coach Kalen DeBoer announced that he would become the new head coach of Washington in the PAC-12 Conference beginning in 2022. Assistant head coach and running backs coach Lee Marks was named interim head coach for the team's bowl game. On December 8, the school announced that Jeff Tedford had been rehired as head coach after taking two years off for health issues.
On December 2, Colorado State announced that they had fired head coach Steve Addazio after two seasons.
On December 6, Nevada head coach Jay Norvell left the school to take the vacant head coach position at Colorado State.

Schedule
The season began on August 28, 2021, and concluded on November 27, 2021.

Regular season

Week zero

Week one

Week two

Week three

Week four

Week five

Week six

Week seven

Week eight

Week nine

Week ten

Week eleven

Week twelve

Week thirteen

Week fourteen

Postseason

Bowl Games

Hawaii was originally slated to play in the Hawaii Bowl against Memphis on December 24. The team was forced to withdraw from the bowl game due to a shortage of available players, stemming from a combination of a COVID-19 outbreak within the team, players already out with injury, and players who transferred away from the school at the conclusion of the regular season.

Boise State was originally slated to play in the Arizona Bowl against Central Michigan on December 31. The team was forced to withdraw from the bowl game due to a COVID-19 outbreak within the team. The Arizona Bowl was cancelled, and Central Michigan was instead invited to move to a vacated spot in the Sun Bowl.

Mountain West records vs Other Conferences
2021–2022 records against non-conference foes:

Regular Season

Post Season

Mountain West vs Power Five matchups 
The following games include Pac-12 teams competing against Power Five conferences teams from the (ACC, Big Ten, Big 12, Notre Dame, BYU and SEC). All rankings are from the AP Poll at the time of the game.

Mountain West vs Group of Five matchups
The following games include Mountain West teams competing against teams from the American, C-USA, MAC or Sun Belt.

Mountain West vs FBS independents matchups
The following games include Mountain West teams competing against FBS Independents, which includes Army, Liberty, New Mexico State, UConn or UMass.

Mountain West vs FCS matchups
The Football Championship Subdivision comprises 13 conferences and two independent programs.

Awards and honors

Player of the week honors

Mountain West Individual Awards
The following individuals received postseason honors as voted by the Mountain West Conference football coaches at the end of the season.

All-conference teams
The following players were selected as part of the Mountain West's All-Conference Teams.

All–Americans

The 2021 College Football All-America Teams are composed of the following College Football All-American first teams chosen by the following selector organizations: Associated Press (AP), Football Writers Association of America (FWAA), American Football Coaches Association (AFCA), Walter Camp Foundation (WCFF), The Sporting News (TSN), Sports Illustrated (SI), USA Today (USAT) ESPN, CBS Sports (CBS), FOX Sports (FOX) College Football News (CFN), Bleacher Report (BR), Scout.com, Phil Steele (PS), SB Nation (SB), Athlon Sports, Pro Football Focus (PFF) and Yahoo! Sports (Yahoo!).

Currently, the NCAA compiles consensus all-America teams in the sports of Division I-FBS football and Division I men's basketball using a point system computed from All-America teams named by coaches associations or media sources.  The system consists of three points for a first-team honor, two points for second-team honor, and one point for third-team honor.  Honorable mention and fourth team or lower recognitions are not accorded any points.  Football consensus teams are compiled by position and the player accumulating the most points at each position is named first team consensus all-American.  Currently, the NCAA recognizes All-Americans selected by the AP, AFCA, FWAA, TSN, and the WCFF to determine Consensus and Unanimous All-Americans. Any player named to the First Team by all five of the NCAA-recognized selectors is deemed a Unanimous All-American.

National award winners
John Mackey Award: Trey McBride, Colorado State
Ray Guy Award: Matt Araiza, San Diego State

NFL draft

The following list includes all Mountain West players who were drafted in the 2022 NFL Draft.

References